Joie is a name and is French for "joy."

As a given name
 Joie Chen (born 1961), American television anchor
 Joie Chitwood (1912–1988), American racecar driver and businessman
 Joie Chitwood III, American racecar driver and businessman
 Joie Davidow, American author and editor
 Joie Lee (born 1962), American screenwriter, film producer and actress
 Joie Ray (disambiguation), multiple people, including:
Joie Ray (athlete) (1894–1978), American middle and long distance runner
Joie Ray (racing driver) (1923-2007), American open-wheel and stock-car racer

As a surname
 Chester Joie, Boston slave

See also
Joy (given name)
Joey (given name)
Lajoie (disambiguation)
Joie de vivre

French feminine given names